Avianca is a Colombian airline.

Avianca may refer to the following:

Airlines and related firms 
Avianca, the current Colombian flag carrier airline founded in 1919.
Avianca Cargo, a Colombian cargo airline and wholly owned subsidiary.
Avianca Taxi, Helicol, a subsidiary providing aviation services.
Avianca Group - Avianca Group International Ltd., the restructured successor company of Avianca Holdings
Avianca Holdings, formerly AviancaTaca AirHoldings Inc.
Avianca TACA Holding
Avianca Express, a subsidiary Colombian regional airline.
Avianca El Salvador, formerly TACA, nationally branded airline in the Avianca Holdings group.
Avianca Guatemala, formerly branded Aviateca.
Avianca Costa Rica, formerly known as LACSA.
Avianca Honduras was founded as Isleña Airlines.
Avianca Nicaragua, formerly Aeronica before became NICA, this also included La Costeña (airline).
Avianca Ecuador was founded through a merger between VIP Ecuador and AeroGal.
Avianca Perú, formerly TACA Perú, defunct airline of Peru.
Avianca Panama, Aeroperlas, former regional airline of Panama.
Avianca Services, MRO unit providing aircraft services.
AviancaPlus, former frequent flyer program.
Avianca, brand name for two independent airlines owned by Synergy Group.
Avianca Argentina, former regional airline owned by Synergy Group.
Avianca Brasil, former Brazilian airline owned by Synergy Group.
Avianca destinations, list of Avianca destinations.
Avianca El Salvador destinations, list of Avianca El Salvador destinations.
Avianca Ecuador destinations, list of Avianca Ecuador destinations.
Avianca Peru destinations, list of Avianca Perú destinations.
Avianca Brazil destinations, list of Avianca Brasil destinations.

Avianca accidents and incidents
1947 Avianca Douglas DC-4 crash
Avianca Flight 4
Avianca Flight 011
Avianca Flight 011 victims.
Avianca Flight 52
Avianca Flight 203
Avianca Flight 410
Avianca Flight 671

People
Avianca Böhm, a South African-born New Zealand actress, model and former beauty pageant titleholder.
Frank Avianca, was the artist name as film actor and producer of the American rock and roll singer Frankie Sardo.

Places
Avianca Building, a skyscraper located at Bogotá, Colombia.

Sports
Avianca Colombia Open, former golf tournaments on the Tour de las Américas events.

Avianca